The following is a list of U.S. Highways in Maryland. There are currently 14 U.S. Highways that exist entirely or partially in the U.S. state of Maryland. Seven of these are primary U.S. Highways while seven are auxiliary U.S. Highways that may or may not be related to one of the primary U.S. Highways. All U.S. Highways are maintained by the Maryland State Highway Administration except for the portions that run through Baltimore, Hagerstown, and Cumberland. Maryland has five former U.S. Highways; those five are shaded in dark gray in the list.

Mainline routes

Special routes

See also

References

US Highways